Russell A. Potter (born 1960) is an American writer and college professor, and guitarist. His work encompasses hip hop culture, popular music, and the history of British exploration of the Arctic in the nineteenth century, as well as the material in the courses he teaches in English literature at Rhode Island College.

His books include Spectacular Vernaculars: Hip-Hop and the Politics of Postmodernism (1995) and Arctic Spectacles: The Frozen North in Visual Culture, 1818-1875 (2007), as well as a novel, Pyg: The Memoirs of a Learned Pig (2011). He teaches at Rhode Island College, where he is editor of the Arctic Book Review. He also worked as a consultant on, and appears in, the Nova documentary Arctic Passage (2006). In 2021, Potter's albums were reissued on vinyl LPs.

Biography
Potter was born in Cleveland, Ohio in 1960.  He attended St. John's Lutheran School, Gilmour Academy, and the Friends School in Cleveland (later the School on Magnolia).  In 1979, he founded the Black Snake record label, on which he released two albums of his own solo guitar compositions, as well as a 45 rpm single of a bluegrass version of Devo's "Mongoloid" by the Hotfoot Quartet. He later attended Goddard College and The Evergreen State College; he earned his Ph.D. in English Literature from Brown University in 1991. He lives in Providence, Rhode Island.

He is a professor at Rhode Island College in Providence, Rhode Island. He has developed courses in English on several topics, including literature in Victorian England. He has posted material on that era, about an early detective and his representation in Bleak House, a novel by Charles Dickens.

Books
Spectacular Vernaculars: Hip-hop and the Politics of Postmodernism, SUNY Press 1995
Arctic Spectacles: The Frozen North in Visual Culture, 1818-1875, University of Washington Press 2007
Pyg: The Memoirs of a Learned Pig, Canongate Books 2011
 Finding Franklin: The Untold Story of a 165-Year Search, McGiill-Queen's University Press 2016

References

External links 
 Rhode Island College webpage   
 
 

20th-century American male writers
20th-century American novelists
21st-century American male writers
21st-century American novelists
1960 births
American male novelists
Brown University alumni
Evergreen State College alumni
Goddard College alumni
Living people
Novelists from Ohio
Syracuse University alumni
Writers from Cleveland